Oligodon juglandifer, the walnut kukri snake, is a species of snake found in northeastern India.

References

 Smith, M.A. 1943 The Fauna of British India, Ceylon and Burma, Including the Whole of the Indo-Chinese Sub-Region. Reptilia and Amphibia. 3 (Serpentes). Taylor and Francis, London. 583 pp.
 Wall,F. 1909 Notes on snakes from the neighbourhood of Darjeeling. J. Bombay nat. Hist. Soc. 19 : 337-357

juglandifer
Reptiles described in 1909